Chuzhikovo is a rural locality (a selo) in Starooskolsky District, Belgorod Oblast, Russia. The population was 243 as of 2010. There are 7 streets.

Geography 
Chuzhikovo is located 30 km southeast of Stary Oskol (the district's administrative centre) by road. Dmitriyevka is the nearest rural locality.

References 

Rural localities in Starooskolsky District